Subhas Anandan (25 December 1947 – 7 January 2015) was an Indian-Singaporean notable criminal lawyer. He had appeared in numerous notable cases, including a case involving actress Quan Yi Fong hitting a taxi driver in 2010, and a case involving retail tycoon Tang Wee Sung in 2008 — who tried to illegally purchase a kidney from a living donor, as well as many murder cases, like those of Anthony Ler who manipulated and instigated a 15-year-old boy to kill his estranged wife in 2001; Took Leng How, who murdered Huang Na in 2004; robber and kidnapper Abdul Nasir bin Amer Hamsah; Tan Chor Jin, who shot a nightclub owner in Serangoon; and Leong Siew Chor, who killed and dismembered his lover.

Anandan also represented Salakau gang member Khairul Famy bin Mohamed Samsudin who fatally assaulted national football player Sulaiman bin Hashim, security guard Maniam Rathinswamy who murdered a loan shark, maid abuser Ng Hua Chye who abused and killed his maid, drug trafficker Pang Siew Fum who was assisted by Cheong Chun Yin to import 2kg of heroin, fishmonger Lau Lee Peng who robbed and murdered his friend and fruit-seller Tan Eng Yan, kidnapper Tan Ping Koon who abducted a child for ransom, and the five gang members who were accused of murdering 19-year-old Republic Polytechnic student Darren Ng Wei Jie at Downtown East in 2010. He also represented convicted murderer Mathavakannan Kalimuthu in his 1997 appeal and 1998 clemency plea, and successfully convinced President of Singapore Ong Teng Cheong to grant then 19-year-old Mathavakannan clemency and commute his death sentence to life imprisonment. Anandan also defended mechanic Nadasan Chandra Secharan, who was charged with murdering his lover, and Anandan successfully convinced the Court of Appeal to overturn Nadasan's death sentence and issue him an acquittal on the grounds that he was not at the scene of crime and the prosecutors' weak evidence against him.

At the time of his death, Subhas Anandan was the senior partner in law firm RHTLaw Taylor Wessing LLP and headed its department in criminal law. He was a founding member and the first president of the Association of Criminal Lawyers of Singapore. He was also the president of Cuesports Singapore, the national sports association for billiards, snooker, and pool. Towards the end of his life, Anandan's health began to deteriorate and he died of heart failure in January 2015. He was survived by his wife and son, Sujesh Anandan, who is also a lawyer.

Early life

Anandan was born on 25 December 1947 to Raman Anandan and Govindan Pushpanjaly, in Travanore-Cochin, (now Kerala, India. When he was five months old, the family migrated from India to Singapore, where his father had found work as a clerk in the British Royal Navy. They lived in the staff quarters within the British naval base in Sembawang until his father retired in the early 1970s.

Anandan attended primary and secondary school in the naval base, first at Admiralty Asian School and then Naval Base School, where he excelled academically. In 1963, after achieving a first grade in his Senior Cambridge (now 'O' Level) examinations, he went back India to study medicine in Madras (now Chennai) under the request of his mother. But after the first few lessons, he was convinced that he was not meant to be a doctor. He returned home after three months and started his pre-university education at Raffles Institution in 1964.

After completing his Higher School Certificate (now 'A' Level) examinations, he wanted to join the police force but eventually enrolled in the University of Singapore (now National University of Singapore) at the insistence of his father. While pursuing a degree in law, he participated in various extra-curricular activities, including playing on the university's football team and serving as secretary-general of the Socialists' Club. He obtained his law degree in 1970 and went on to become to the protégé of Chan Sek Keong, then a senior partner at law firm Shook Lin & Bok and, later, a Chief Justice of Singapore.

Later years and career

In March 1976, Anandan was arrested by the police for suspected involvement in a secret society under the Criminal Law (Temporary Provisions) Act. He was released from remand and exonerated in November of the same year following an investigation by the Corrupt Practices Investigation Bureau.

Anandan started the Association of Criminal Lawyers of Singapore in 2002, with the goal of raising the number of criminal lawyers in the country. In 2011, Anandan, alongside law practitioners including Rajan Menon, founded RHTLaw TaylorWessing and stayed on as one of its senior partners until his death.

Anandan had started his practice handling mainly civil, accident and family cases but soon began gravitating towards criminal law. In his lifetime, he had handled over a thousand criminal cases involving a wide range of crimes, including murder, rape, domestic worker abuse, drug trafficking and white-collar offences. Known for his sharp and stinging attacks in the courtroom, he was nicknamed "the Basher" within the law community. His presence in court had been characterised as intimidating, given his fierce stares and voluminous beard. As one of Singapore's top criminal defence lawyers, he had appeared so frequently in the media that some people called him a "publicity hound".

While Anandan was critical of some aspects of the criminal justice system in Singapore, he believed that the system had to be followed. He also had a personal mantra of "the most heinous offenders deserve their day in a court of law"; hence Anandan had claimed to have never rejected cases because of the offence the person had been charged with.

In 2013, Anandan was part of the 12-member steering committee to guide the development of the Singapore University of Social Sciences School of Law.

Personal life and death

Anandan first applied for Singapore citizenship in 1972, but was informed a decade later that his application had been turned down. He tried again 2002, and was then finally granted citizenship.

Subhas Anandan was married with Vimala Kesavan. The couple had a son, Sujesh Anandan (born in 1990 or 1991), who also became a lawyer like his father. Sujesh was reportedly called to the Bar in early 2019. Two of Anandan's nephews, Sunil Sudheesan and Anand Nalachandran, were also lawyers. Of the two nephews, Sudheesan's mother is of Chinese descent.

According to Anandan's book, The Best I Could, former Solicitor-General Francis Seow owed Anandan S$25,000 since the 1980s, after Seow left the country when faced with income tax charges.

Anandan was particularly passionate about big-capacity cars. He developed this liking in his secondary school days, when he saw other students driving or being driven around in luxury cars like Mercedes Benzes and Jaguars. Beside owning luxury cars, he liked collecting antique or miniature swords, sabres and kris. He often went to the Singapore Cricket Club to play snooker and billiards as a means of releasing work-induced stress. He also spent most of his time at the Holy Tree Sri Balasubramaniar Temple, where he was the chairman of its Board of Trustees.

An active sportsman in his youth, Anandan was taking 22 types of medication every day because of his deteriorating health in the later years up to his death. He had three heart attacks, and had also undergone a heart bypass and an angioplasty. He had also lost one kidney to cancer and was a diabetic.

At around 2300 hours (GMT+8) on 7 January 2015, Anandan died while hospitalised at Singapore General Hospital of complications from heart failure, which he was diagnosed with in 2014. His death triggered an outpouring of grief especially amongst members of the law industry in Singapore. Law Minister K. Shanmugam hailed Anandan as a "titan in criminal law" as well as a "legal legend", while Attorney-General V. K. Rajah lauded his "uncanny legal acumen". His funeral, which was attended by "hundreds", was held the next evening and Anandan's body was cremated with Hindu rites on the same day.

Legacy

Anandan was awarded the Legal Eagle Award of 2001 conferred by the Law Society of Singapore.

Anandan was honoured by the Association of Muslim Lawyers on 28 October 2014 for his substantial contributions towards the legal profession and being a champion of pro bono work for several decades. A tribute ceremony was held at the Supreme Court Auditorium and attended by some 400 members of the legal community, including Law Minister K. Shanmugam, former President S. R. Nathan, Attorney-General V. K. Rajah and several judges. At the ceremony, the newly formed "Yellow Ribbon Fund Subhas Anandan Star Bursary Award" worth S$250,000 was launched which would provide financial support to ex-inmates who wished to pursue further education and a second chance in society, a cause pioneered by Anandan during his four-decade career. Anandan's 2009 book, The Best I Could, documenting his more famous cases, was adapted into a Channel 5 television series of the same name. It ran for two seasons. Anandan's second book, It's Easy To Cry, was posthumously published on 15 September 2015.

See also

 Capital punishment in Singapore

Former cases of Subhas Anandan:

 Murder of Huang Na
 Anthony Ler
 Kallang River body parts murder
 Tan Chor Jin
 Oriental Hotel murder
 Murder of Sulaiman bin Hashim
 Death of Darren Ng Wei Jie
 Mathavakannan Kalimuthu
 Killing of Muawanatul Chasanah
 Pang Siew Fum
 1998 Tampines flat murder
 Tan Ping Koon
 Mandai burnt car murder

References

Bibliography

 
 

1947 births
2015 deaths
20th-century Singaporean lawyers
Indian emigrants to Singapore
Naturalised citizens of Singapore
Deaths from cancer in Singapore
21st-century Singaporean lawyers